Australian singer and songwriter Anthony Callea has released seven studio albums, one live album, one extended play and fifteen singles.

Albums

Studio albums

Live albums

Video albums

Extended plays

Singles

Notes

Soundtrack appearances

Album appearances

Music videos
The Prayer
The Prayer (Live on Idol Top 8)
Rain
Bridge over Troubled Water (LIVE on Idol)
Hurts So Bad (LIVE)
Per Sempre (for Always)
Live for Love
Addicted to You
Oh Oh, Oh Oh
Last To Go
My All
What's Wrong with Me?
Heaven
Only One

References

Discographies of Australian artists
Pop music discographies
Rhythm and blues discographies